Anang Ma'ruf  (born in Surabaya, 28 May 1976) is Indonesian football player who currently plays for Persegres Gresik.

Career
Anang Ma'ruf started his career with Persebaya in early 1990s. Then he joined PSSI Primavera Program in Italy in middle 1990s. Anang had stint with Persija in 2001 when he became champion of Indonesia League. He picked up a left elbow dislocation during match against Persitara on 11 November 2009. The doctor (Dr. Dwikora Novembri Utomo, SpOT) said, he was likely to rest six weeks.

International goals

Honours

Club honors
Persebaya Surabaya
Liga Indonesia Premier Division (2): 1996–97, 2004
Liga Indonesia First Division (1): 2006

Persija Jakarta
Liga Indonesia Premier Division (1): 2001

Country honors
Indonesia
Southeast Asian Games silver medal (1): 1997
Southeast Asian Games bronze medal (1): 1999
Indonesian Independence Cup (1): 2000

References

External links

Profile in Liga Indonesia Official Website 

Indonesian footballers
1976 births
Living people
Sportspeople from Surabaya
Indonesia international footballers
Persebaya Surabaya players
Persija Jakarta players
Deltras F.C. players
Gresik United players
Liga 1 (Indonesia) players
Indonesian Super League-winning players
Association football fullbacks